Edmund Bertschinger (born 1958) is an American theoretical astrophysicist and cosmologist and professor of physics at MIT.

Career
Bertschinger received his bachelor's degree in physics from Caltech in 1979, and his Ph.D. degree in astrophysical science from Princeton University in 1984.  He held postdoctoral positions at the University of Virginia and UC Berkeley, then went to MIT as an assistant professor of physics in 1986 becoming a full professor in 1996. He served as head of the physics department from 2007 to 2013 and currently serves as the Institute Community and Equity Officer. He has served on various committees promoting women and minorities in astronomy and physics. He has received numerous fellowships and awards including the Guggenheim Fellowship and Helen B. Warner Prize for Astronomy. He was elected Fellow of the American Association for the Advancement of Science in 2015 and the American Physical Society in 1996.

Research
Bertschinger is known for his work on large-scale simulations of galaxy formation (N-body simulation), the study of galaxy velocity fields (Peculiar velocity), and various problems in relativistic astrophysics. He has made substantial contributions to cosmological perturbation theory and structure formation in the universe.

Selected publications

References

California Institute of Technology alumni
Princeton University alumni
Massachusetts Institute of Technology School of Science faculty
American cosmologists
American astrophysicists
1958 births
Living people
MIT Center for Theoretical Physics faculty
Fellows of the American Association for the Advancement of Science
Fellows of the American Physical Society